This is a list of bridges and other crossings from Laval, Quebec to the north shore of the Rivière des Mille Îles from where it joins the Rivière des Prairies upstream to the Ottawa River (Lac des Deux Montagnes).

See also
 List of crossings of the Rivière des Prairies
 List of crossings of the Saint Lawrence River
 List of bridges in Montreal
 List of bridges in Quebec
 List of crossings of the Ottawa River

References

External links 
 Interactive map of Laval from the official website Shows both the borders and names of the 14 former municipalities (purple) and the borders only of the current 6 sectors (maroon), tick off both boxes beside "Limite administrative".

Crossings
Riviere des Mille Iles
Bridges in Laval, Quebec
Buildings and structures in Laurentides
Buildings and structures in Lanaudière
Transport in Laurentides
Transport in Lanaudière